Etinosa Erevbenagie (born October 13, 1995), is a Greek professional basketball player for Anorthosi. He played at the youth squads of Panathinaikos, before starting his pro career.

Early life
Erevbenagie was born in  Lagos, Nigeria. He immigrated to Greece at a very young age and played with the youth squads of Panathinaikos, being a teammate with players such as Georgios Papagiannis, Vassilis Charalampopoulos and Georgios Diamantakos.

Professional career
After leaving Panathinaikos, Erevbenagie started his pro career with Kymis of the Greek B Basket League, being coached by Vassilis Bratsiakos. With Kymis, he won the promotion to the Greek A2 Basket League.

The nest season, he joined Bilbao Basket of the Liga ACB. During that year, he didn't appear in a single game with Bilbao and he was loaned to Ametx Zornotza during the season.

The following season, Erevbenagie returned to Greece and signed with Kavala of the Greek A2 Basket League. During the season, he was one of the best young players of the league, averaging 12.3 points, 3.5 rebounds and 3.5 assists per game.

References

External links
Real GM.com Profile
Euroleague Profile
Eurobasket.com Profile

1995 births
Living people
Greek men's basketball players
Greek people of Nigerian descent
Guards (basketball)
Kavala B.C. players
Kymis B.C. players